Pârscov is a commune in Buzău County, Muntenia, Romania. It is composed of twelve villages: Bădila, Curcănești, Lunca Frumoasă, Oleșești, Pârjolești, Pârscov, Robești, Runcu, Târcov, Tocileni, Trestieni and Valea Purcarului.

Pârscov is the birthplace of the Romanian poet Vasile Voiculescu.

Notes

Communes in Buzău County
Localities in Muntenia